Islander was the 34-foot yawl with which Harry Pidgeon sailed around the world single-handedly from 1921 to 1925. Pidgeon thus became the second person, after Joshua Slocum, to do so. He accounts for his adventures in his book, Around the World Single-Handed: The Cruise of the Islander (1932).

History
Islander was modelled on Sea Bird, a 25-foot V-bottom boat that was designed by Charles D. Mower with input from Captain Thomas Fleming Day. Pidgeon built Islander from 1917 to 1918 using only $1,000 of materials. Islander was built mostly from oak, Douglas fir, and Oregon pine. Writing about his voyage later, Pidgeon commented that Islander "proved to sail well, and all remarked on the ease with which she handled."

References

Yawls
Individual sailing vessels
1910s sailing yachts
Sailing yachts built in the United States
Sailing yachts of the United States